The 2019 Ball State Cardinals football team represented Ball State University during the 2019 NCAA Division I FBS football season. The Cardinals were led by fourth-year head coach Mike Neu and played their home games at Scheumann Stadium in Muncie, Indiana. They competed as members of the West Division of the Mid-American Conference.

Preseason

MAC media poll
The MAC released their preseason media poll on July 23, 2019, with the Cardinals predicted to finish in fifth place in the West Division.

Schedule

Source:

Personnel

Coaching staff

Game summaries

vs. Indiana

Fordham

Florida Atlantic

at NC State

at Northern Illinois

at Eastern Michigan

Toledo

Ohio

at Western Michigan

Central Michigan

at Kent State

Miami (OH)

Players drafted into the NFL

References

Ball State
Ball State Cardinals football seasons
Ball State Cardinals football